LARP stands for live action role-playing game.

Larp may also refer to:

 Larp (dish), the national dish of Laos
 LHC Accelerator Research Program

See also 
 False flag